Senzar may refer to :

 Senzar language
 a historical name of Shaizar in Syria